Shkarin is a rural locality (a khutor) in Oktyabrvskoye Rural Settlement, Bobrovsky District, Voronezh Oblast, Russia. The population was 153 as of 2010. There are 2 streets.

Geography 
Shkarin is located 33 km east of Bobrov (the district's administrative centre) by road. Nikolskoye is the nearest rural locality.

References

External links
Закон Воронежской области от 15 октября 2004 года № 63-ОЗ «Об установлении границ, наделении соответствующим статусом, определении административных центров отдельных муниципальных образований Воронежской области»
 Список сельских населённых пунктов и численности населения по данным статистического учёта Бобровского муниципального района. msu.vrnoblduma.ru

Rural localities in Bobrovsky District